Aavani Thingal is a 2006 Indian Tamil language romantic drama film directed by Harikrishna. The film stars newcomers Subramanian Gopalakrishnan, Tejini and Mathisha, with Livingston, Kadhal Sukumar, Delhi Kumar, Ajay Rathnam, Ramkumar, Lavanya and Sundari playing supporting roles. It was released on 17 November 2006.

Plot
In a remote village, Rasappa (Subramanian Gopalakrishnan) is an orphan who works as a servant in the house of the local bigwig Periyavar (Delhi Kumar). Rasappa wants to get married and his friend Singamuthu (Kadhal Sukumar) recommends him to meet Ponnusamy (Livingston). Ponnusamy is a marriage broker who had failed to arrange the marriage of his three elder daughters and they all eloped with their boyfriends. Gayathri (Mathisha) is Ponnusamy's daughter and her mother Saroja (Sundari) wants her to have an arranged marriage. In the meantime, Periyavar's granddaughter Deepika (Tejini), a modern city woman, comes to the village after her engagement to live in her grandfather's house. Soon, Rasappa and Deepika have a misunderstanding and they start to quarrel for every small thing. Rasappa who falls in love with Gayathri asks her parents to give their daughter in marriage but her mother Saroja refuses and humiliates him. The heartbroken Rasappa finally understands that without money no one will be interested in giving their daughter in marriage. To earn more money, Rasappa takes up a high-risk job as a bomb-setter for drilling wells. Rasappa soon becomes wealthy thanks to his hard work.

Gayathri's parents eventually accept to give their daughter in marriage. One week before the marriage, Rasappa has a severe accident while setting a bomb in a well because of the naughty behaviour of Deepika. Rasappa survived the explosion but has lost his right arm, therefore, the marriage is cancelled. Feeling guilty for what happened to Rasappa, Deepika decides to help him to find a bride. After many failed attempts, they find the beautiful Rasathi (Lavanya) who accepts to marry Rasappa despite being an amputee man. The day before the marriage, Rasappa finds out that Rasathi is a fraud who had married many men before and eloped on the very next day with their valuable belongings. He decides to not call off the marriage. Deepika who is aware of the situation asks Rasappa to marry her the next morning at the village temple in secret. The next morning, Rasappa comes to the temple and refuses to marry Deepika. To Deepika's surprise, Gayathri and her family come to the temple. Gayathri tells Deepika that she fell in love with Rasappa after the betrothal. Her parents say that Rasappa is a gem of a person and are willing to give him their daughter in marriage. The film ends with Rasappa and Gayathri getting married.

Cast

Subramanian Gopalakrishnan as Rasappa
Tejini as Deepika
Mathisha as Gayathri
Livingston as Ponnusamy
Kadhal Sukumar as Singamuthu
Delhi Kumar as Periyavar
Ajay Rathnam as Deepika's father
Ramkumar as Janakiraman
Lavanya as Rasathi
Sundari as Saroja, Ponnusamy's wife
Sempuli Jagan as Periyavar's aid
Suryakanth as Vedi Veerasamy
Sangeetha Balan as Rasathi's mother
Viji Ketti as Deepika's mother
Chelladurai as Madasamy
Vellai Subbaiah as Astrologer
Amirtha Ganesh
Selvakumar as Rasathi's father
Krishnakanth
Pallu Babu
Selvam

Production
Harikrishna, a one-time associate of director K. S. Ravikumar, made his directorial debut with Aavani Thingal under the banner of Rayar Films International. Newcomer Subramanian Gopalakrishnan (credited as Srikumar) was selected to play the lead role. Newcomer Tejini, a theatre artist in Mumbai who had acted in few stageplays before, and Mathisha were chosen to play the heroines. A major portion of the film was shot in Udumalaipettai, Pollachi and Chalakudy. Speaking of the film, the director said, "It is a romantic entertainer with a different storyline".

Soundtrack

The film score and the soundtrack were composed by R. Shankar. The soundtrack features 6 tracks.

Reception
Malini Mannath of Chennai Online wrote that "The debutant director has attempted to give a clean, wholesome entertainer sans violence or overt glamour. The scenes have a natural build-up, and the narration is steady paced, though a bit leisurely at times".

References

2006 films
2000s Tamil-language films
2006 romantic drama films
Indian romantic drama films
2006 directorial debut films